The 2015 Finlandia Trophy was a senior international figure skating competition in the 2015–16 season. A part of the 2015–16 ISU Challenger Series, the 20th edition of the annual event was held on October 9–11, 2015 at the Barona Areena in Espoo. October 8th was an unofficial practice day. Medals were awarded in the disciplines of men's singles, ladies' singles, ice dancing, and synchronized skating.

Entries
The entries as of October 8, 2015 were:

Changes to preliminary assignments
 On October 8, 2015, Elena Radionova withdrew from the event due to health problems. She was not replaced.
 On October 8, 2015, Sara Hurtado / Adrià Díaz withdrew from the event due to Hurtado having an injured ankle. They were not replaced.

Results

Men

Ladies

Ice dancing

Synchronized skating

References

External links
 2015 Finlandia Trophy at the International Skating Union
 2015 Finlandia Trophy: Official Website at Finnish Figure Skating Association

2015
Finlandia Trophy